Rema, also known as Bothar, is a nearly extinct Papuan language of New Guinea.

References

Tonda languages
Languages of Western Province (Papua New Guinea)
Endangered Papuan languages
Severely endangered languages